The 1981–82 Northern Football League season was the 84th in the history of Northern Football League, a football competition in England. At the end of the season the Northern League expanded to two divisions for the first time since 1899–1900.

Clubs

Division One featured 20 clubs which competed in the league last season, no new clubs joined the division this season.

League table

References

External links
 Northern Football League official site

Northern Football League seasons
1981–82 in English football leagues